Never Shout Never (originally typeset as nevershoutnever! and NeverShoutNever!) is an American rock band formed in Joplin, Missouri in 2007. Vocalist and multi-instrumentalist Christofer Drew began the band as a solo project before expanding it to a band, whose best-known lineup included himself, bassist Taylor MacFee, and drummer Hayden Kaiser. The band that accompanied Drew when it was a solo project were originally known as "The Shout". Never Shout Never released eight full-length albums and eight EPs.

History

2007–2008: Formation and early career
Christofer Drew Ingle began making music under the alias nevershoutnever! in 2007, when he was 16 years old. His first exposure came through the internet, where he achieved success on Myspace before issuing the extended play, The Yippee EP on July 29, 2008, and selling 46,000 copies in the US. On July 30, 2008, he was featured on TRL, where he performed his single "Bigcitydreams". The single peaked at number 1 on the Billboard Hot Singles Sales chart. He toured with Hellogoodbye and Ace Enders in the fall of 2008.

As of November 17, 2008, the official spelling of Ingle's alias became NeverShoutNever!. The spelling was updated on iTunes and his management company's site. NeverShoutNever! started touring with The Scene Aesthetic, The Honorary Title, and The Bigger Lights in late February 2009 and then toured with bands such as Forever the Sickest Kids, The Cab, and Mercy Mercedes, among others in spring 2009 as part of The Bamboozle Roadshow 2009. He played at both The Bamboozle Left 2009 and The Bamboozle 2009.

2009–2010: Warner Bros. signing and What Is Love

In early 2009, he released his 3rd extended play Me & My Uke and his single "Trouble" from the EP peaked at number 5 on the Hot Singles Sales chart. The song was certified gold in May 2012. It was announced on May 29, 2009, that Ingle had signed to Warner Bros. Records, ending a major-label bidding war. As part of the deal, Ingle runs and make releases on his own imprint label, Loveway Records. Ingle's alias became officially stylized as Never Shout Never. The Summer was Ingle's first release under Warner Bros. and was released on June 23, 2009. It sold 46,000 copies and the first single from the EP, titled "Happy", was released on iTunes on March 3, 2009.

A self-titled EP, Never Shout Never was released in December 2009 and featured two songs from his upcoming debut album ("What Is Love?" and "Jane Doe"), a re-recorded version of a song from The Yippee EP ("She's Got Style"), and a live version of a song from The Yippee EP ("Big City Dreams"). The debut album from Never Shout Never, What Is Love?, was produced by Butch Walker and released on January 26, 2010. Never Shout Never performed on the Vans Warped Tour 2010, which toured the United States. The album peaked at number 24 on the Billboard 200 chart and sold 21,000 copies.

2010–2011: Harmony and Time Travel

Never Shout Never headlined its first Warped Tour in Summer of 2010. Never Shout Never's second full-length album, Harmony, was released in August 2010. In October and November 2010, Never Shout Never co-headlined the Harmony Tour, where the bands had fans gather can foods to help those in need. As a gift to the fans, Never Shout Never and The Maine released a live split EP. The split EP was made available for free download on Never Shout Never's website.

The band's hometown, Joplin, Missouri, was heavily damaged by a tornado on May 22, 2011. Following the destruction, Ingle began a relief fund with United Way to raise $1.2 million for his hometown. To raise awareness about the devastation of Joplin, Ingle took video footage of the destruction and posted it on YouTube on June 1, 2011. The video, which features the song "Time Travel", encouraged viewers to donate to the relief of the town via his United Way fund. The official music video for "Time Travel" was directed by Joey Boukadakis.

Never Shout Never's third album, Time Travel was released on September 20, 2011.

2012: Indigo

Ingle first revealed the title of the group's fourth studio album in an interview with Alter The Press! on May 8, 2012, and on September 20, via his Twitter account, he announced the release date of his new album Indigo. Never Shout Never's fourth full-length album, Indigo was released November 13, 2012. It debuted at 194 on the Billboard 200, a steep decline from the group's previous high of 14. The band toured the U.S. on the Indigo tour in late 2012.

2013: Sunflower and The Xmas EP
 
During 2013, Never Shout Never went back onto the Warped Tour lineup after a three-year break. During the Warped Tour, Ingle had also teamed with BandHappy, an organization in which experienced musicians taught amateurs how to reach success. He had led a workshop in which a limited number of fans could ask questions and learn from him, with the addition of a one-on-one meet and greet. Never Shout Never released its fifth album, Sunflower, on July 2, 2013. A festive EP titled The Xmas EP was released on November 25, 2013.

2014-2017: Recycled Youth, Black Cat, and Departure of MacFee

In late 2013, Never Shout Never announced that the group was working on a new album called Recycled Youth, Vol. 1. The album will feature re-worked songs from previous Never Shout Never releases. In January 2014 the band announced that the group had begun recording the album, and was expected to be released later that year. Ian Crawford was revealed to have joined the band in early 2014 as lead guitarist. Recycled Youth, Vol. 1 was released on March 3, 2015.

The first song off of Never Shout Never's sixth full-length album, titled "Hey! We OK", was released on June 9, 2015. Pre-orders for the album were released on iTunes on the band's official store the same day, including a limited deluxe bundle, where the first 100 orders received one of the items signed. The song "Boom!" was released on the Vans Warped Tour 2015 Compilation CD. The album was released on August 7, 2015. On November 24, 2015, Ian Crawford confirmed on his Facebook page that he had been let go from the band.

On June 26, 2016, bassist Taylor MacFee announced his departure from the band.

2017-2018: "Throwback Tour" and break-up 
Never Shout Never performed during the 2017 Warped Tour before going on the Throwback Tour. The tour lasted throughout 2017 where they played songs from earlier albums that likely wouldn't be played again for a long time.

On March 23, 2018, the band released a cover of Elvis Presley's "Love Me Tender" on their upcoming cover album "All for Love" composed entirely of covers of love songs. On April 2, they released their cover of the Beatles' "Something".

Ingle revealed in December 2018 that after a small tour in Mexico and Brazil the following month that Never Shout Never would disband. However, he reached out to fans via an Instagram post two days later asking if he should keep making music under the name. Following the final show in Brazil (with long-time drummer Hayden Kaiser absent) he stated he was uncertain of the band's future, but no official breakup announcement has yet been confirmed.

It is unlikely All for Love was finished and will ever be released. Drew continued to upload a handful of covers on YouTube, but these were likely not final recordings for the album, nor were they likely intended to be on the album at all.

2020-2022: Unborn Spark, initial retirement and return 
On April 29, 2020, Drew tweeted a video announcing a solo acoustic album titled Unborn Spark, due for release on May 13, his son's 1st birthday. However, on May 5, he announced that he needed a little more time for mixing and artwork to be completed. On May 17, he announced that the album would be released on June 12. On June 8, the first single, "Time to Change", was released. With it came the announcement that it would be released as a Never Shout Never album, per the official Never Shout Never Twitter account's first tweet since May 2017.

In early 2021, Drew began posting tweets and Instagram stories concerning a new project he was working on, stating he was playing everything himself. These posts have since either been deleted or disappeared after 24 hours, and it is unclear if this is or was intended to be either a Never Shout Never project or a solo project. Drew released a single titled "Easy Swagger" in October 2021. On March 8, 2022, Drew announced his retirement from music, putting an end to the band. In additional, Drew confirmed on Twitter that Never Shout Never was finished. However, on December 24, 2022, he announced that Never Shout Never would be returning the following year and also announced a release of a new album.

Band members

Current members
 Christofer Drew – lead vocals, guitars, bass, ukulele, violin, drums, percussion, piano, keyboards, synthesizers, programming, banjo, harmonica, (2007–present)

Former members
 Caleb Denison – guitars, drums, percussion, backing vocals (2008–2011)
 Ian Crawford – guitars, backing vocals (2014–2015)
 Taylor Macfee – bass, backing vocals (2008–2016)
 Zachary Honeymam - drums (touring drummer)
 Hayden Kaiser – auxiliary percussion, backing vocals, drums, guitars (2009–2018)
 Dustin Dobernig – piano, percussion, keyboards, violin (2009–2011)
 Nathan Ellison – drums, percussion (2008–2011) 
 Tof Hoglen – keyboards (2016–2018)

Timeline

Discography

Albums
What Is Love? (2010)
Harmony (2010)
Time Travel (2011)
Indigo (2012)
Sunflower (2013)
Recycled Youth (2015)
Black Cat (2015)
Advent of Violett Soul (2016)
Unborn Spark (2020)

Awards and nominations

Alternative Press Music Awards
 
|-
| 2016
|style="text-align:left;"| "Hey! We Ok"
|Song of the Year
| 
|}

mtvU Woodie Awards
 
|-
| 2009
|style="text-align:left;"| "Never Shout Never"
|Breaking Woodie
| 
|}

PETA's Libby Awards

|-
|2011
| "Christofer Drew"
| Sexiest Vegetarian
| 
|}

References

External links

Never Shout Never at MTV
Never Shout Never at Purevolume
Interview with Never Shout Never on Shockhound
Interview with Never Shout Never on Thought Catalog

2007 establishments in Missouri
Rock music groups from Missouri
Sire Records artists
Warner Records artists
Musical groups established in 2007
Musical groups disestablished in 2018